Parzegan-e Sofla (also Romanized as Parzegān-e Soflá) is a village in Chenarud-e Shomali Rural District, Chenarud District, Chadegan County, Isfahan Province, Iran. At the 2006 census, its population was 187, in 45 families.

References 

Populated places in Chadegan County